Pacific Western Transportation (also d/b/a P.W. Transportation) provides a variety of bus services in the Canadian provinces of British Columbia, Alberta, Saskatchewan, Ontario and Yukon. Depending on the location, it offers scheduled and chartered school busing, municipal transit and handi-bus services, airport passenger services and local and long distance coach charters.  Since 2022, it is a subsidiary of Student Transportation of America.

Lines of business
Pacific Western Transportation Group of Companies is separated into four operating divisions:

The PWT Motor Coach division provides intercity scheduled (retail) as well as commercial charter transportation across Alberta, specialized health transfer service in British Columbia, and airport passenger and charter transfer services in Ontario.

The PWT Employee division services Fort McMurray and the Athabasca oil sands in northern Alberta.

The PWT Student Transportation division operates in British Columbia, Alberta, Saskatchewan, Yukon, Nova Scotia and Ontario.

The PWT Transit division operates in British Columbia, Alberta and Ontario.

Motorcoach

Red Arrow Motorcoach
Red Arrow provides inter-city coach transportation between Fort McMurray, Edmonton, Red Deer, Calgary, Lethbridge, with a connecting shuttle bus to Calgary International Airport.  Red Arrow fleet consists of Prevost H3-45 coaches equipped as follows: wheelchair accessible, seat belts, Wifi, computer plug-ins and a snack galley on board.

Ebus
Ebus service started on October 11, 2011 and operates Prevost H3-45 and X3-45 coaches.  This subsidiary of Red Arrow travels between Edmonton, Red Deer, Fort McMurray and Calgary in Alberta as well as Kamloops, Kelowna and Vancouver in British Columbia.  Service between Edmonton and Kamloops is provided through a partnership with Thompson Valley Charters.

BC Bus North

BC Bus North is an intercity bus service in northern British Columbia.

On-It Regional Transit
On-It Regional Transit is a commuter bus service from Cochrane and Okotoks to Calgary, and seasonal service to Banff and Canmore.

Northern Health Connections
Northern Health Connections joins remote communities in British Columbia to health facilities.

Employee transportation

Diversified Transportation
Diversified Transportation is a bus transportation company based in Fort McMurray that provides services to industry and private coach charters as well as operating some local city transit systems.

Student transportation

Southland Transportation
Southland Transportation is a Calgary based bus company that mainly provides school bus service to local school boards, bus charter services and commuter service from Cochrane and Okotoks to Calgary and also servicing northern Alberta from Edmonton, Cold Lake, etc. North Battleford is the location of the Southland operation in Saskatchewan providing school bus services to local school boards, and industrial and contract charters.

Prairie Bus Lines
Prairie Bus Lines is based in Red Deer and provides primarily school bus services as well as industrial and charter

Standard Bus
Standard Bus is based in British Columbia.

Transit

Alberta
 St. Albert Transit
 Leduc Transit
 Fort Sask Transit
 Airdrie Transit
 Beaumont Transit
 Cold Lake Transit

British Columbia
 Prince George Transit System 
 Whistler Transit System

Former

Airport Express
PW Airport Express was purchased after the demise of Gray Coach, which had a franchise to operate a route to the Toronto Pearson International Airport. The service connects between selected downtown Toronto locations and Pearson Airport.

The Toronto Airport Express was discontinued on October 31, 2014 due to falling ridership and the anticipated opening of the Union Pearson Express, a rail link connecting the airport to downtown Toronto.

Porter shuttle
Porter Airlines provides a shuttle bus service for its passengers between the Royal York Hotel in downtown Toronto and the ferry dock/passenger tunnel to the Billy Bishop Toronto City Airport (island airport). The service is operated by Pacific Western at 10-minute intervals using Thomas SLF buses.  This service has stopped as of March 2020.

Highway 3 Connector
Highway 3 Connector was a commuter bus service from Lethbridge to Medicine Hat.

Incidents
 On December 25, 2022, an Ebus running from Kelowna to Vancouver rolled over killing 4 and sending 52 other people on board to hospital. The accident occurred on Highway 97C east of Merritt in the British Columbia Interior. The suspected cause of the accident was icy road conditions.

References

External links
 Official site
 Pacific Western Transit

Intercity bus companies of Canada
Bus transport in Alberta
Bus transport in Yukon
Bus transport in Saskatchewan
Bus transport in British Columbia
Bus transport in Ontario
Transport in Toronto
Companies based in Calgary